It Came from the Closet: Queer Reflections on Horror is a collection of essays about horror films as analysed by queer writers. Edited by writing professor Joe Vallese, the book was published by The Feminist Press at CUNY on October 4, 2022.

Major themes 
One of the main themes explored by some of the essays present in It Came from the Closet is the connection that some queer people might feel with the antagonist of the movie, which is exemplified by essays such as Sachiko Ragosta's, about Eyes Without a Face, and Viet Dinh's, who writes about Sleepaway Camp.

Reception 
Halie Kerns, reviewing for the Library Journal, called it "[a]n excellent purchase for any film or queer studies collection" and noted that the themes of gender and sexuality, explored in a way they called "often purposefully grotesque", would be relatable to many of its readers. Publishers Weekly gave the book a starred review and called it a "stellar anthology" and added that "[t]here's not a weak piece in the pack".

A review for The Booklist said It Came from the Closet, due to the "essential context of [the writers'] own experiences", which is easier to read than other studies on the same topic. They commended Carmen Maria Machado for her essay on Jennifer's Body, calling it "particularly sublime." The reviewer called the collection "[a] critical text on the intersections of film, queer studies, and pop culture that will appeal to both academic and public-library audiences."

In a review published by Autostraddle, Abeni Jones talked about the usefulness of the collection to readers who might not necessarily enjoy horror films but who are looking for queer representation, citing essays on Jaws and The Birds as examples. Jones also praised the essays for not being overly analytical, saying "[t]hese are personal essays, not queer theory papers."

References 

2022 non-fiction books
American essay collections
Essays about film
The Feminist Press Books
Queer literature
2020s LGBT literature